Gary Sheard is a sailor from Australia, who represented his country at the 1984 Summer Olympics in Los Angeles, United States as helmsman in the Soling. With crew members Tim Dorning and Dean Gordon they took the 7th place.

References

Living people
1969 births
Sailors at the 1984 Summer Olympics – Soling
Olympic sailors of Australia
Australian male sailors (sport)